Brushfire Fairytales is the debut album by singer-songwriter Jack Johnson. It was released in 2001 through Enjoy Records, a label that was later renamed Everloving Recordings. 

The album's primary musicians are Johnson (vocals/guitars/piano), Adam Topol (drums/percussion) and Merlo Podlewski (bass). It was produced by J. P. Plunier, recorded and mixed by Todd Burke, with assistant engineers Andrew Alekel & Chad Essig. It was recorded near Hollywood and Vine just north of 6400 Sunset at 1520 N Cahuenga in Los Angeles at Grandmaster Recorders (formerly Bijou Studios in Hollywood), King Sound, and mastered by Dave Collins. Guests include Tommy Jordan (steel drums on "Flake") and Ben Harper (slide guitar on "Flake"). The single "Flake" was Jack Johnson's first.

In a retrospective review by The Quietus, reviewer David Bennun credits Brushfire Fairytales with helping to popularize a strain of "sensitive [and] authentic... indie-folk" that would later lead to artists such as Ed Sheeran, Passenger, and Mumford & Sons.

Track listing 
All songs written by Jack Johnson.
 "Inaudible Melodies" – 3:35
 "Middle Man" – 3:14
 "Posters" – 3:13
 "Sexy Plexi" – 2:07
 "Flake" – 4:40
 "Bubble Toes" – 3:56
 "Fortunate Fool" – 3:48
 "The News" – 2:26
 "Drink the Water" – 3:21
 "Mudfootball" (for Moe Lerner) – 3:03
 "F-Stop Blues" – 3:10
 "Losing Hope" – 3:52
 "It's All Understood" – 5:28
Japan bonus track
 "Inaudible Melodies" (live) – 3:27
UK bonus tracks
 "Flake" (live) – 4:29
 "Inaudible Melodies" (live) – 3:27

Personnel
Jack Johnson – vocals, guitars, piano on "It's All Understood"
Adam Topol – drums, percussion
Merlo Podlewski – bass guitar

Additional musicians
Sam Beam – backing vocals on "It's All Understood" (uncredited on album)
Ben Harper – slide guitar on "Flake"
Tommy Jordan – steel drums on "Flake"
Christopher Yeoh – mandolin

Charts

Weekly charts

Year-end charts

Certifications

References

External links 
 Jack Johnson's official site
 Official Jack Johnson Fansite
 Everloving Records official site

Jack Johnson (musician) albums
2001 debut albums
Everloving Records albums